Andrei Mikhailovich Trofimov (born 2 July 1985) is a former Russian professional football player.

Club career
He played in the Russian Football National League for FC Neftekhimik Nizhnekamsk in 2004.

External links 
 
 

1985 births
Living people
Russian footballers
Association football midfielders
FC Neftekhimik Nizhnekamsk players
PFC CSKA Moscow players
FC Zenit-2 Saint Petersburg players
FC Oryol players